"Don't Mind" is the debut single by American hip hop recording artist Kent Jones. The song was released on April 25, 2016, by Epidemic Records, We the Best Music Group and Epic Records as a single from his debut mixtape Tours (2015). The official remix features Pitbull and Lil Wayne.

Background and composition  
"Don't Mind" was written by Jones, Marcello Valenzano, Andre Lyon, DJ Khaled, Barry White, Gerald Levert and Edwin Nicholas. The song was produced by Jones, Cool & Dre and Khaled. The song contains resung and replayed elements ("Telling me this..." in the chorus) of White's 1994 song "Practice What You Preach". In an interview with Billboard, Jones said, "I've always been inspired by Motown and soul. I'm a huge Barry White fan, so I had to pay homage. I wasn't like, "This is the one!"—I freestyled the whole thing. It's probably my 400th record. I've got a lot of music."

The song was composed and recorded in twelve hours. "I made the beat; the hook was in my head; the day I recorded the whole thing -- I didn’t even write it," Jones said." The song itself was inspired by the multiculturalism of Jones' home city of Miami. As he told the BBC, "It's a melting pot - Spanish, Haitian, French, Asian. And in that melting pot, I stuck with the greetings that were most comfortable to me. You hear a lot of people say 'hola'. Spanish is a language that happens to take a waltz in other people's back yards."

Remix 
An official remix of the song features rappers Pitbull and Lil Wayne and was released on July 12, 2016.

Music video
The song's accompanying music video premiered on March 10, 2016, on Kent Jones' YouTube account. It features an appearance from DJ Khaled.

Commercial performance
"Don't Mind" debuted at number 63 on Billboard Hot 100 for the chart dated May 21, 2016. It peaked at number 8. The song was certified Platinum by the Recording Industry Association of America (RIAA) for selling over 1,000,000 digital copies in the United States.

Charts

Weekly charts

Year-end charts

Certifications

References

External links

2015 songs
2016 debut singles
Kent Jones (rapper) songs
Songs written by Kent Jones (rapper)
Songs written by DJ Khaled
Songs written by Cool (record producer)
Songs written by Dre (record producer)
Songs written by Barry White
Songs written by Gerald Levert
Song recordings produced by DJ Khaled
Song recordings produced by Cool & Dre
Epic Records singles
American pop songs